José Ángel Esmorís Tasende (born 4 January 1997), known by the diminutive Angeliño, is a Spanish professional footballer who plays as a left back or left midfielder for Bundesliga club 1899 Hoffenheim, on loan from RB Leipzig.

Club career

Early career
Angeliño was born in Coristanco, Galicia. He joined Deportivo La Coruña's youth setup in 2007 at age 10, after starting it out at EF Luis Calvo Sanz (the youth setup of Bergantiños FC) in Carballo, Galicia. He spent six years in their youth system.

Manchester City
On 8 July 2012, Angeliño signed a four-year deal with Manchester City, being effective in January of the following year. Initially assigned to the under-18s, he also appeared regularly with the reserves.

On 30 January 2016, Angeliño made his debut for the first team in a 4–0 away win against Aston Villa, coming on in the 81st minute to replace Gaël Clichy in the FA Cup. He played for the club twice in the 2016–17 season, making his Champions League debut on 24 August, as a substitute in a 1–0 win over Steaua București. His next appearance came on 21 September, starting in a 2–1 win over Swansea City in the EFL Cup.

2015–2018: Loans in the U.S. and Europe
Angeliño signed for New York City on loan in 2015. Angeliño made his professional debut for the club on 12 July 2015 in a 4–4 draw against Toronto. Angeliño came on for Kwame Watson-Siriboe in the 46th minute and played the entire second half of the match. He had his first interview for the club on 16 July 2015. He made his first start in a 1–0 defeat to New England Revolution, playing the full 90 minutes.

It was announced on 27 December 2016 that Angeliño would be loaned to Girona from 1 January 2017 to the end of the season. On 31 January, it was announced that, having not made a single appearance for Girona, Angeliño would instead be loaned to Mallorca. He made his debut on 5 February, in a substitute appearance in a 2–1 loss to Real Oviedo.

On 4 July 2017, Angeliño was loaned to NAC Breda for the forthcoming season. During his season, he won four Rookie of the Month awards while scoring three goals and delivering seven assists.

PSV Eindhoven
After his impressive debut season in the Eredivisie, Angeliño signed for PSV Eindhoven on 15 June 2018, signing a five-year contract. By the season's end, he was voted into the Eredivisie Team of the Season and was named the Talent of the Season, after winning 189 duels and creating 68 chances.

Return to Manchester City
Manchester City re-signed Angeliño on 3 July 2019 after triggering a buy-back clause in his contract. Angeliño made his debut in the 2019–20 Premier League season on 21 September, coming on as a half-time substitute for Benjamin Mendy in an 8–0 routing of Watford at the Etihad.

2019–2021: Loans to RB Leipzig
On 31 January 2020, having made 12 appearances for Manchester City, Angeliño was loaned to German Bundesliga club RB Leipzig until the end of the season. He made 13 league appearances, scoring once and assisting three times. On 13 August, Angeliño provided the assist for the late winning goal in a 2–1 victory against Atletico Madrid in the Champions League quarter-final, helping the club reach their first ever Champions League semi-final.

On 8 September 2020, Manchester City announced that Angeliño's loan to RB Leipzig would be extended for the duration of the 2020–21 campaign. On 20 October 2020, Angeliño scored a brace in a 2–0 win over İstanbul Başakşehir in the 2020–21 UEFA Champions League. In the final group stage match on 8 December, Angeliño scored his side's first goal in a 3–2 win over his parent club's bitter rivals Manchester United to knock them out of the competition.

RB Leipzig
On 12 February 2021, Angeliño's loan to RB Leipzig was made permanent after he signed a four-year contract with the German club, for an undisclosed fee.

Personal life
Angeliño's younger brother Dani Tasende is also a footballer and a left back. He also played for Manchester City as a youth.

Career statistics

Club

Honours
Manchester City
 FA Community Shield: 2019

RB Leipzig
 DFB-Pokal: 2021–22
Individual
 Manchester City EDS Player of the Year: 2014–15
 Eredivisie Talent of the Month: September 2017, December 2017, February 2018, April 2018, September 2018
 Eredivisie Talent of the Year: 2018–19
 Eredivisie Team of the Year: 2017–18, 2018–19
 UEFA Champions League Squad of the Season: 2019–20
 Bundesliga Team of the Season: 2020–21
 kicker Bundesliga Team of the Season: 2020–21

References

External links

Manchester City profile

1997 births
Living people
Footballers from Galicia (Spain)
People from Bergantiños
Sportspeople from the Province of A Coruña
Spanish footballers
Spain youth international footballers
Spain under-21 international footballers
Association football defenders
Association football midfielders
Manchester City F.C. players
New York City FC players
Girona FC players
RCD Mallorca players
NAC Breda players
PSV Eindhoven players
RB Leipzig players
TSG 1899 Hoffenheim players
Major League Soccer players
Segunda División players
Eredivisie players
Premier League players
Bundesliga players
Spanish expatriate footballers
Expatriate footballers in England
Expatriate footballers in Germany
Expatriate footballers in the Netherlands
Expatriate soccer players in the United States
Spanish expatriate sportspeople in England
Spanish expatriate sportspeople in Germany
Spanish expatriate sportspeople in the Netherlands
Spanish expatriate sportspeople in the United States